The Fallen Journalists Memorial Foundation (FJM Foundation) exists to construct a permanent memorial in Washington, D.C., to honor fallen journalists. The effort was launched as an initiative of the Tribune Publishing Company by its chairman, David Dreier, at the National Press Club Journalism Institute in June 2019. That marked the first anniversary of the deadliest assault against journalists in United States history. On June 28, 2018, a gunman killed five employees in the newsroom of Tribune's Capital Gazette in Annapolis, Maryland. 

Dreier, who is a former senior member of the United States House of Representatives (1981–2013) and a longtime champion of press freedoms, has said that he looks forward to leading this multi-year effort to its completion.

The only memorial commemorating journalists located in Washington, D.C., resided at the Newseum, which closed at the end of 2019. Dreier has said that, in addition to the mass shooting at the Capital Gazette in 2018, the closing of the Newseum provided inspiration for the FJM project.

The Annenberg Foundation and the Michael and Jackie Ferro Foundation have provided initial funds for the FJM Foundation.

Legislation 
The enactment of federal legislation is required to authorize the establishment of a commemorative work in Washington, D.C. The approval of the National Capital Memorial Advisory Commission is required as well.

On June 25, 2019, a bipartisan and bicameral group of members of the United States Congress introduced the Fallen Journalists Memorial Act (H.R. 3465 and S. 1969), which would permit the construction of a Fallen Journalists Memorial in Area I (not including the "Reserve") or Area II of Washington, D.C., as depicted by U.S. National Park Service Map Number 869/86501 B dated June 24, 2003. This permissible area includes all of Washington, D.C. except the "Reserve" (shaded red on the map), which stretches from Lafayette Park neighboring the White House (north) to the Jefferson Memorial (south), and from the Capitol (east) to the Lincoln Memorial (west).

In accordance with the Commemorative Works Act of 1986, the FJM project will be funded with private donations.

Progress 
On September 24, 2019, representatives from the FJM Foundation, including President Barbara Cochran, testified before the National Capital Memorial Advisory Commission in support of a permanent memorial to fallen journalists. The Commission tentatively voted to support the effort. On December 4, 2019, the House Natural Resources Subcommittee on National Parks, Forests, and Public Lands heard testimony on the memorial from Cochran and Representative Napolitano. On January 15, 2020, the House Committee on Natural Resources voted to advance the Fallen Journalists Memorial Act so that the legislation will be considered by the full House of Representatives.

On September 21, 2020, the House of Representatives passed the Fallen Journalists Memorial Act, originally sponsored by Representatives Grace Napolitano (D-California) and Tom Cole (R-Oklahoma). On December 2, 2020, the Senate passed the Fallen Journalists Memorial Act, originally sponsored by Senators Rob Portman (R-Ohio) and Ben Cardin (D-Maryland).

On December 23, 2020, President Donald Trump signed the Fallen Journalists Memorial Act into law.

The foundation has announced that it plans to seek a location for the memorial in Area I of National Park Service Map Number 869/86501, adjacent to the National Mall and the U.S. Capitol.  In September 2022, U.S. Secretary of the Interior Deb Haaland recommended that Congress allow the foundation to consider sites in Area I.  The Consolidated Appropriations Act, 2023 approved a location for the memorial in Area I. The intended location is at 3rd Street and Independence Avenue SW between the Voice of America building and the National Museum of the American Indian.

Board of Advisors 

 Wallis Annenberg – Annenberg Foundation
 Dean Baquet – The New York Times
 Bret Baier – Fox News
 Willow Bay – USC Annenberg School for Communications and Journalism
 Amanda Bennett – Voice of America (VOA)
Wolf Blitzer – CNN
 Tom Brokaw – NBC News
 Christopher Dolan – The Washington Times
 Major Garrett – CBS News
 Donald Graham – Graham Holdings Company
 Hugh Hewitt – Salem Radio Network
 Brit Hume – Fox News
 Al Hunt – formerly Bloomberg News and The Wall Street Journal
 Rick Hutzell – Capital Gazette Communications
 Alberto Ibargüen – John S. and James L. Knight Foundation
 Dr. John L. Jackson Jr. – Annenberg School for Communication at the University of Pennsylvania
 Tom Johnson – formerly CNN and Los Angeles Times
Jonathan Karl - ABC News
 Cinny Kennard – Annenberg Foundation
 David Hume Kennerly – former White House photographer
 Alison Fitzgerald Kodjak – NPR (National Public Radio)
 Andrea Mitchell – NBC News
 Matt Murray – The Wall Street Journal
 Jan Neuharth – Freedom Forum, Freedom Forum Institute, and Newseum
 Clarence Page – Chicago Tribune
 Norman Pearlstine – Los Angeles Times
 Christopher Ruddy – Newsmax Media
 Tom Rosenstiel – American Press Institute
 Bob Schieffer – formerly CBS News
 Gerald F. Seib – The Wall Street Journal
 Joel Simon – Committee to Protect Journalists
 Catherine Merrill Williams – Washingtonian Media
 Judy Woodruff – PBS NewsHour

References

External links 
 
 
 

Foundations based in Washington, D.C.
Organizations established in 2019
Journalism organizations
2019 establishments in Washington, D.C.
American journalism organizations